Kingsbury Brook is a tributary of Huntington Creek in Luzerne County, Pennsylvania, in the United States. Wild trout naturally reproduce in the stream. The surficial geology in its vicinity mainly consists of alluvium, Wisconsinan Till, Wisconsinan Ice-Contact Stratified Drift, bedrock, and wetlands.

Course
Kingsbury Brook begins in a valley southeast of the community of Southdale, in Huntington Township. It flows southwest for a short distance before turning south-southwest and then west-southwest, passing through a small pond. The stream then turns southwest and receives an unnamed tributary from the right. It then turns south for a few tenths of a mile before crossing State Route 4006 and then receives an unnamed tributary from the left. A short distance further downstream, it reaches its confluence with Huntington Creek.

Tributaries
Kingsbury Brook has no named tributaries. However, it does have two unnamed tributaries.

Geography and geology

The surficial geology along Kingsbury Brook in its lower reaches mainly features alluvium, which contains stratified sand, silt, gravel, and some boulders. Some Wisconsinan Ice-Contact Stratified Drift, which contains stratified sand and gravel along with some boulders, is present along the sides of the stream's valley. Further away from the stream, the surficial geology includes a glacial or resedimented till known as Wisconsinan Till, as well as a patch of Wisconsinan Bouldery Till. The upper reaches of the stream mainly have Wisconsinan Till in their vicinity. The surficial geology of the area features bedrock consisting of sandstone and shale in a few places.

Watershed
The stream is entirely within the United States Geological Survey quadrangle of Stillwater.

History
Kingsbury Brook was entered into the Geographic Names Information System on August 2, 1979. Its identifier in the Geographic Names Information System is 1178500.

There is a patch of wetland in the vicinity of the lower reaches of Kingsbury Brook. The stream is near the community of Southdale.

Biology
The drainage basin of Kingsbury Brook is designated as a Coldwater Fishery and a Migratory Fishery. Wild trout naturally reproduce in the stream from its headwaters downstream to its mouth.

See also
Pine Creek (Huntington Creek), next tributary of Huntington Creek going downstream
Rogers Creek, next tributary of Huntington Creek going upstream
List of tributaries of Fishing Creek (North Branch Susquehanna River)
List of rivers of Pennsylvania

References

Rivers of Luzerne County, Pennsylvania
Tributaries of Fishing Creek (North Branch Susquehanna River)
Rivers of Pennsylvania